Mian Umar Hayat (born 1945 in Lahore, Punjab, Pakistan, died 1996)   was a businessman and entered into politics in 1988. He was twice elected as a Member of the National Assembly of Pakistan, serving two consecutive terms, the first from November, 1988–1990 and 1990–1992.

Early life 
His family was a prominent landlord and lawful Arain family in Lahore.  His father, Mian Muhammad Akbar, was a barrister. He was admitted to the bar at law from University of Lincoln, England.

He served as the chairman of Pakistan Railways.

References

1945 births
1996 deaths
Businesspeople from Lahore
Politicians from Lahore